The Ethiopia women's national under-20 football team represents Ethiopia in international youth women's football competitions.

The team won the first edition of the CECAFA Women's U-20 Championship.

History

Competitive record

 Champions   Runners-up   Third place   Fourth place  

Red border color indicates tournament was held on home soil.

See also 
 Ethiopia women's national football team

References 

under-20
African women's national under-20 association football teams